The 2020 All Japan High School Soccer Tournament (All Japan JFA 99th High School Soccer Tournament (Japanese: 第99回全国高等学校サッカー選手権大会)) marked the 99th edition of the referred annually contested cup for High Schools over Japan. As usual, the tournament was contested by 48 High Schools, with 1 High School per Prefecture being qualified for the tournament, with an exception made for the Tokyo, which had 2 High Schools representing their Prefecture. The final was played at the Saitama Stadium 2002.

The Yamanashi Gakuin High School won the tournament over Aomori Yamada by 4–2 on a penalty shoot-out, after a 0–0 draw on regulation time.

Calendar
The tournament took place in a 12-day span, with the tournament split in a total of 6 stages.

Venues
The tournament was played in four prefectures and nine stadiums, with six (two for each prefecture) located in Chiba, Kanagawa, and Tokyo Prefectures, and three located in Saitama. They are:

Tokyo – Ajinomoto Field Nishigaoka, and Komazawa Olympic Park Stadium
Saitama – Saitama Stadium 2002, Urawa Komaba Stadium and NACK5 Stadium Omiya
Kanagawa – NHK Spring Mitsuzawa Football Stadium and Kawasaki Todoroki Stadium
Chiba – Fukuda Denshi Arena and ZA Oripri Stadium

Participating clubs
In parentheses: the amount of times each team qualified for the All Japan High School Tournament (appearance in the 2020 edition included)

Schedule
The schedule and the match pairings were confirmed on 16 November 2020.

First round

Second round

Third round

Quarter-finals

Semi-finals

Final

References

External links
Official Schedule (JFA)
About the Tournament (JFA)

Football competitions in Japan
Youth football competitions
2020 in Japanese football